Foxy Shazam is an American rock band from Cincinnati, Ohio formed in 2004. , the band's lineup consists of lead vocalist Eric Nally, pianist Sky White, trumpeter and backing vocalist Alex Nauth, bassist Trigger Warning, guitarist Devin Williams and drummer Teddy Aitkins. The band released their debut album The Flamingo Trigger independently in 2005 before signing with Ferret Music, under which they released their second album Introducing Foxy Shazam in 2008. The following year, the band recorded its first major label record with producer John Feldmann. Foxy Shazam signed with Sire Records and released its self-titled major-label debut in 2010. The band's fourth studio album, The Church of Rock and Roll, was released in January 2012. Gonzo, the band's fifth album, was released April 2, 2014.

They announced in October 2014 they were disbanding for an unknown length of time. The band scheduled a reunion concert at the Taft Theatre in Cincinnati, Ohio on January 30, 2020, which sold out immediately. The concert was originally scheduled for April 11, 2020, but rescheduled due to the COVID-19 pandemic. The group released their sixth album Burn in December 2020, through their own Eeeoooah label. They released their seventh album, The Heart Behead You, in February 2022, also through Eeeoooah.

Biography

1997–2007: Train of Thought and the formation of the Foxy Shazam!
In 1997, Eric Nally started nu-metal group Train of Thought. After Loren Turner joined the group in 2003, they later released a self-released extended play (EP), which consisted of two songs. In 2004, they decided to change the name of the band to "Foxy Shazam!" due to several members of Train of Thought leaving and a change in sound. On June 15, 2005, the band released their official debut album, titled The Flamingo Trigger. In support of their debut album, the band toured all across the country from 2005 to 2007.

2008–2009: Signing to Ferret Music and Introducing
After the band's debut tour, the group announced that they signed a record deal to Ferret Music. On January 22, 2008, they released their second album, titled Introducing. The album was supported by their lead single: "A Dangerous Man". In 2008, they were named as one of the "100 Bands You Need to Know" by Alternative Press, which led the band earning their spots on tours with bands such as The Darkness, The Strokes, The Sounds, The Fall of Troy, Hole, Portugal. The Man, Tub Ring, The Dear Hunter, Tera Melos, Free Energy, Bad Rabbits, Panic! at the Disco and The Young Veins, to support for their second studio release.

2010: Signing to Sire Records and self-titled album

In 2010, Foxy Shazam was included on the Spin list of "Ten Bands You Need To Know". The lead vocalist from the band, Eric Sean Nally wrote songs for Meat Loaf's album Hang Cool, Teddy Bear. The band announced that they signed a deal to Sire Records. On February 7, 2010, their single "Unstoppable" was used in the Super Bowl XLIV telecast as background music for the first half highlights. The track was featured on the NHL 11 video game and it was included on the Cartoon Network's second live-action show Tower Prep as a theme song. The song was also included in a trailer of the movie Your Highness, and the song was featured in a series of the commercials for MLB Network. On April 13, 2010, they released their self-titled third album, Foxy Shazam. The band then performed at Lollapalooza festival. They appeared in many magazines such as Alternative Press and Spin to support the album. The band played a 3-song set on Fuel.tv's The Daily Habit,, a 5-song set on shockhound.com, as well as performing an acoustic 3-song set for Spin Magazine. In July 2010, the band visited the Chicago's JBTV, where they were interviewed and then they performed live and premiered their exclusive version of "Oh, Lord" to the music discovery app, titled Shazam. The band was later named as the spotlight band for the 2011's Warped Tour.

2011–2013: Signing to IRS Records and The Church of Rock and Roll
On December 5, 2011, Foxy Shazam announced the title to their fourth album, The Church of Rock and Roll, revealed the album's final track listing, along with a cover artwork and the release date for January 2012. On January 24, 2012, they released the album. It included three singles: "I Like It", "Holy Touch" and "Welcome to the Church of Rock and Roll". After the band toured, serving as the opening act for The Darkness. Foxy Shazam announced that they would be embarking on a headlining tour starting in April 2012. They performed at their hometown Bunbury Music Festival in Cincinnati, OH in July.  They then toured as the opening act for Slash on his North American tour dates from September 4 to October 4, 2012.

2014: Gonzo and hiatus
On March 12, 2014, it was announced via 96ROCK that the band had completed work on their latest LP and that it would be released in the same month. The album's title was announced and it was indicated to be a concept album. On April 2, 2014, the band released Gonzo online for free through Bandcamp. Gonzo is the band's first self-released album since 2005's The Flamingo Trigger. The band recorded the album together live in one room with producer Steve Albini.

The band released a music video for the single "Tragic Thrill". On October 27, 2014, Foxy Shazam announced on their Facebook page that they were disbanding indefinitely, four days before embarking on the second US leg of their Gonzo tour but intended to get back together at some future date.

In 2015, Eric Nally was featured on Macklemore & Ryan Lewis' song "Downtown", the first single from their upcoming second album. Other band members have remained in Cincinnati and have gone on to have considerable local and regional success since the hiatus began. In 2015 trumpet player Alex Nauth formed The Skulx with ex-members of Cincinnati bands The Killtones and Cadaver Dogs. The band was nominated for a Cincinnati Entertainment Award for New Artist of the Year in late 2015. In late 2014 bassist Daisy Caplan founded Cincinnati-based band Babe Rage. The group disbanded in 2015.

In 2016, Caplan began playing drums for Lung, an experimental rock duo, with electric cellist Kate Wakefield. The band received two Cincinnati Entertainment Award nominations in 2017 in the categories of Best New Artist and Best Indie/Alternative Artist. Guitarist Loren Turner performed briefly with a group called Trxlleydxdgers (pronounced "trolley dodgers") in 2016. Keyboardist Sky White performs with the J Dorsey Band and founded the Wendigo Tea Company in 2015.

2020: Return and Burn
On February 7, 2020, the official Foxy Shazam Instagram and Twitter released a teaser trailer of the band's return, featuring lead singer Eric Sean Nally. The band have released three singles in 2020, "Burn", "Dreamer", and "The Rose". On August 12, 2020, the band uploaded a music video for "Dreamer" alongside a new band photograph showing their new drummer Teddy Aitkins and masked bassist Trigger Warning. Shortly after the shooting of the videoclip for dreamer, guitarist Loren Turner left the band. In October 2020, they announced their sixth studio album Burn, which was released on December 11, 2020. For the recording process of the album, the band split up in duos; pianist Sky White and drummer Teddy Aitkins recorded their parts in the Legendary London Bridge studio in Seattle, guitarist Loren Turner and bassist Trigger Warning recorded at The LodgeKY studio in Dayton, Kentucky. Finally, vocalist Eric Nally and hornplayer Alex Nauth added their parts in Ryan Lewis' Mundon Canyon Studios to complete the album. It was released on both vinyl and CD on their own label Eeeoooah releases.

2022: The Heart Behead You and Hidden Treasures Tour
On October 5, 2021, the band announced their seventh studio album The Heart Behead You, and released a short vignette featuring the opening track of the new album "I'm in Love". The album was released on Valentine's Day, February 14, 2022. This was the first Foxy Shazam album to feature the band's new guitarist Devin Williams.

On October 27, 2021 the group announced the first leg of the Hidden Treasures Tour, which would begin with their previously-announced return show at the Andrew J. Brady Music Center in Cincinnati on February 12, 2022 (which had been rescheduled twice due to the COVID-19 Pandemic ), and include seven other stops in the northeastern United States. American blues and soul singer-songwriter Robert Finley opened for Foxy on all stops on this leg of the tour.

On January 1, 2022, director James Gunn released the second official trailer for his Peacemaker TV series on HBO Max, featuring the song "Welcome To The Church of Rock and Roll" from the band's 2012 album The Church of Rock and Roll.

On January 18, 2022, the band released the official music video for "Dancing with My Demons", the second single from The Heart Behead You.

On March 30, 2022, the band announced an additional nine dates for their Hidden Treasures Tour. Jigsaw Youth would open for Foxy for all of these additional dates.

On Thursday, June 30, 2022, the band released a remaster of their debut album, The Flamingo Trigger, on digital streaming services and stores. Later that night, a pre-sale began for both vinyl and CD versions of the album. This was the first time The Flamingo Trigger was officially available anywhere outside of the initial set of CDs that had been sold at the CD release party in 2005 and on their subsequent tour. The 2022 vinyl presale included a limited edition bundle containing a teal-colored pressing of the album, an exclusive t-shirt, and an original flyer from the 2005 CD release show (the bundle was limited to only 200 copies). A gold-colored pressing limited to 180 copies was also made available after the teal bundle sold out. Both limitied editions sold out by the early afternoon on Friday, July 1st, 2022. The vinyl is expected to be released in March 2023.

Music style and influences
Many media outlets compare the band to Queen and Meat Loaf because of its use of theatrics and over-the-top lyrics. Andrew Winney stated, "If Noel Fielding and Freddie Mercury had a love child it would be [Foxy Shazam vocalist] Eric Nally." The magazine Alternative Press compared the band to bands like Queen, My Chemical Romance, and The Darkness, while also believing that the band has a unique sound that should best be seen live.

Origin of their name
The band name was claimed to have originated from a slang phrase used by students at vocalist Eric Sean Nally's high school. "Foxy shazams" meant 'cool shoes'. (e.g. "Damn, those are some foxy shazams!"). In a Rockline radio interview in March 2012, Nally stated that this was not the case by saying that the truth is not as interesting as real life; he had been lying about it for five years and it stuck. This was later confirmed by Alex Nauth and Aaron McVeigh in an interview with Norse Media in July 2012.

Members
Current members
Eric Nally – vocals 
Schuyler White – keyboards 
Alex Nauth – horns, backing vocals 
Teddy Aitkins – drums 
Trigger Warning – bass guitar 
Devin Williams – guitar 

Former members
Loren Turner – guitars 
Aaron McVeigh – drums 
Daisy Caplan – bass guitar 
Joseph Halberstadt – drums 
Elijah Rust – drums 
Kevin Hogle – drums 
John Sims – drums 
Skylyn Ohlenkamp – bass guitar 
Baron Walker – keyboards, bass 
Jamison Pack – drums 
Eli White – bass guitar 
Trever Erb – bass guitar 
Ryan Hogle – guitar

Timeline

Discography

Albums

Studio albums

Singles

Music videos

Other appearances

References

External links
Official website
Foxy Shazam at CincyMusic

2004 establishments in Ohio
Alternative rock groups from Ohio
American glam rock musical groups
American experimental rock groups
I.R.S. Records artists
Musical groups established in 2004
Musical groups disestablished in 2014
Musical groups reestablished in 2020
Musical groups from Cincinnati
Sire Records artists
Ferret Music artists